Marchionni is an Italian surname. Notable people with the surname include:

Bartolomeo Marchionni, Florentine merchant
Carlo Marchionni (1702–1786), Italian architect
Federica Marchionni (born 1971), Italian-American businesswoman
Lorenzo Marchionni (born 1994), Italian footballer
Marco Marchionni (born 1980), Italian footballer
Roberto Marchionni (born 1965), pen name Menotti, Italian comic book artist and screenwriter

Italian-language surnames